
This is a list of aircraft in alphabetical order beginning with 'Tc'.

Tc

TC's Trikes 
(Soddy-Daisy, TN)
TC's Trike
TC's Trikes Coyote

References

Further reading

External links 

 List of aircraft (T)